Circasia is a municipality in the northern part of the department of Quindío, Colombia. It is located 7 km north of the department's capital Armenia. Located wthin the Colombian coffee growing axis, the historic center of Circasia was made part of the "Coffee Cultural Landscape" UNESCO World Heritage Site in 2011.  

Circasia was founded in 1884 by Javier Arias. It became a separate municipality in 1906 when it was separated from Filandia. In 2005 it had an estimated population of 28,800, of which 20,100 live in the main urban zone.

The township is situated a short distance from the highway between Armenia and Pereira. There is a paved road southwest to Montenegro, which passes through most of the rural area of the municipality. There is also a poorly maintained road north to Filandia, which descends to cross the Roble River at a point known as the Aguadeños Pass. However, all public transport to Filandia uses the main highway.

Circasia is known for its Free Cemetery (Spanish: Cementerio Libre), located on the outskirts of the township on the road to Montenegro. It was founded in 1933 by Braulio Botero as a place in which any person could be buried, regardless of their religious beliefs. The cemetery is now a symbol for liberty and equality.

There are many nicely decorated coffee shops by the main square. Circasia also offers destinations for fine dining like La Trattoria, or Donde Kumis Restaurant.

Circasia is quietly becoming a major destination for retirees in search of a quiet chateau style place to spend their spare time. 
It's colder climate sounds very attractive to regional developers.

References

     

Municipalities of Quindío Department